Charles R. Smith (? – 1969) was an American football, basketball and baseball player, coach, and college athletics administrator.  He served as the head baseball coach at San Diego State University from 1936 to 1942 and from 1946 to 1964, compiling a record of 555–289–10.  Smith was also the head basketball coach at San Diego State from 1945 to 1948, tallying a mark of 45–36, and the school's athletic director from 1947 to 1954.  In addition, he served as the president of the California Collegiate Athletic Association and as a district representative to the NAIA.  Smith was also a Brooklyn Dodgers scout for southern California.

Early life and playing career
Smith attended Coronado High School in Coronado, California and then earned 12 varsity letters as San Diego State, four each in football, basketball, and baseball.

Death and honors
Smith died in 1969.  San Diego State's home baseball field, Charlie Smith Field at Tony Gwynn Stadium, was named in Smith's honor.

References

Year of birth missing
1969 deaths
Brooklyn Dodgers scouts
San Diego State Aztecs athletic directors
San Diego State Aztecs baseball coaches
San Diego State Aztecs baseball players
San Diego State Aztecs football coaches
San Diego State Aztecs football players
San Diego State Aztecs men's basketball coaches
San Diego State Aztecs men's basketball players
Sportspeople from San Diego County, California
United States Army personnel of World War II
United States Army officers
People from Coronado, California
Players of American football from California
American men's basketball players
Basketball coaches from California
Military personnel from California